Gergely Aczel (born 1991) is a Chess Grandmaster.

Chess career 
He was awarded his International Master title in 2013 and his Grandmaster title in 2018. He finished second in the 2018 Hungarian Chess Championship.

References

External links
 

Gergely Aczel chess games at 365Chess.com

Chess grandmasters
1991 births
Living people